Echolab was a digital cinema company founded in 1974 and based in Billerica, Massachusetts. It designed and developed video production switchers for digital media markets, such as broadcasting, live production, and events. The company's products included standards and format conversion; live production switching; production and distribution of digital media in a variety of formats.

In July 2010, after ceasing trading two and a half months earlier, its assets were acquired by Blackmagic Design.

History 
In April 2008, Echolab presented its new Overture series of switchers, as well as several optional enhancements. Among these enhancements were MultiPlayMD, a panel-controlled instant replay device and winner of TV Technology's STAR Award for Superior Technology. Additionally, the SD/HD-capable MegaKeyMD clip player, mixer, and keyer provides support for playout of video and animated graphics. Echolab's Conductor control integration system incorporates touchscreen technology to enhance on-air control by automating complex sequences and switching tasks critical to professional-quality production.

In May, 2010 Echolab lost its funding and had ceased trading. Two and a half months after going out of business, EchoLab's intellectual property was then acquired by Blackmagic Design. Blackmagic Design have since then continued and further updated Echolab's products, such as the ATEM Live Production Switchers.

References

Film and video technology
Television technology